= Garhmurra =

- village
- Location within Madhya Pradesh Location within India
- Coordinates: 23.3577599°N 77.4995922°E
- Country: India
- State: Madhya Pradesh
- District: Bhopal
- Tehsil: Huzur
- Elevation: 491 m (1,611 ft)

Population (2011)
  - Total: 943
- Time zone: UTC+5:30 (IST)
- ISO 3166 code: MP-IN
- 2011 census code: 482414

Garhmurra is a village in the Bhopal district of Madhya Pradesh, India. It is located in the Huzur tehsil and the Phanda block.

== Demographics ==
According to the 2011 census of India, Garhmurra has 182 households. The effective literacy rate (i.e. the literacy rate of population excluding children aged 6 and below) is 41.87%.

Demographics (2011 Census)
	Total	Male	Female
Population	943	500	443
Children aged below 6 years	131	59	72
Scheduled caste	56	28	28
Scheduled tribe	132	66	66
Literates	340	203	137
Workers (all)	214	199	15
Main workers (total)	214	199	15
Main workers: Cultivators	66	60	6
Main workers: Agricultural labourers	146	137	9
Main workers: Household industry workers	0	0	0
Main workers: Other	2	2	0
Marginal workers (total)	0	0	0
Marginal workers: Cultivators	0	0	0
Marginal workers: Agricultural labourers	0	0	0
Marginal workers: Household industry workers	0	0	0
Marginal workers: Others	0	0	0
Non-workers	729	301	428
